Russell Road is a section line road within the Las Vegas Valley of Clark County, Nevada. It is no longer a continuous road through the valley, as Harry Reid International Airport interrupts its right of way. The eastern section terminates at the eastern edge of the airport, with the road resuming at Las Vegas Boulevard on the western edge of the airport.  The intersection of Russell Road and Las Vegas Boulevard is often considered to mark the southern terminus of the Las Vegas Strip.

History

SR 594 began at Polaris Avenue as a six-lane city street, and extended easterly to meet Interstate 15 at a diamond interchange. The state highway portion of the road continued east and intersected Frank Sinatra Drive to the south before ending at an intersection with Las Vegas Boulevard.

The Nevada Department of Transportation (NDOT) removed SR 594 from its maintenance logs by the beginning of 2019, and has begun the process of turning ownership of the roadway over to Clark County.

Major SR 594 intersections
The table below indicates junctions along SR 594 at time of removal from state highway system.

Attractions
McCarran International Airport
Mandalay Bay Resort and Casino
Allegiant Stadium
International Museum and Library of the Conjuring Arts

See also

References

External links

Streets in the Las Vegas Valley